Taufik Hidayat (born 16 December 1999) is an Indonesian professional footballer who plays as a forward for Liga 1 club Madura United.

Club career

Persija Jakarta
On 21 May 2019, Persija Jakarta announced a deal for Taufiq to join Indonesian Liga 1 club Persija on a free transfer. Taufiq was brought in by Persija Jakarta to fulfill the quota of seven U-23 players who were the players' requirements
in 2019 season. He promised to forget the thick rivalry between Persija and Persib Bandung. After this, he will do his utmost for the Kemayoran Tiger. He made his professional debut in the Liga 1 on 16 October 2019, against Semen Padang where he played as a substitute.

On 26 January 2022, Taufik scored his first league goal in a 2–1 win over Persita Tangerang at the Ngurah Rai Stadium. On 17 March 2022, he scored in a 1–3 lose over Madura United. nine days laters, he scored the opening goal in a 1–1 draw over Bhayangkara. On 24 July 2022, Taufik scored the opening goal in the first half of the Jakarta International Stadium Grand Launching event match against Thai League 1 club Chonburi, which ended in a 3–3 draw.

Madura United
Taufik Hidayat became Madura United's in half of the 2022–23 Liga 1. Taufik made his debut on 14 January 2023 in a match against Barito Putera at the Demang Lehman Stadium, Martapura.

International career
In October 2021, Taufik was called up to the Indonesia U23 in a friendly match against Tajikistan and Nepal and also prepared for 2022 AFC U-23 Asian Cup qualification in Tajikistan by Shin Tae-yong. On 26 October 2021, Taufik made his debut for Indonesia U-23 national team against Australia U-23 which he scored one goal in that match, in a 2–3 lose in the 2022 AFC U-23 Asian Cup qualification.

Career statistics

Club

Notes

International goals 
International under-23 goals

Honours

Club

Persija Jakarta
Menpora Cup: 2021

References

External links
 Taufik Hidayat at Soccerway

1999 births
Living people
Sportspeople from Bandung
Sportspeople from West Java
Indonesian footballers
Persija Jakarta players
Liga 1 (Indonesia) players
Indonesia youth international footballers
Association football forwards